Rodney Foster (born 13 October 1941) is an English amateur golfer. He was one of the leading British amateurs of the 1960s and early 1970s. He represented Great Britain and Ireland in five successive Walker Cup matches from 1965 to 1973 and twice in the Eisenhower Trophy, in 1964 and 1970.

Foster was relatively unknown when he won the 1964 Berkshire Trophy with a score of 281, two ahead of Michael Attenborough. He was also runner-up in the English Amateur the same year, losing by 1 hole in the 36-hole final to David Marsh. His good performances gained him a place in the four-man Great Britain and Ireland team for the 1964 Eisenhower Trophy. The team led throughout and finished two strokes ahead of Canada.

Amateur wins
1964 Berkshire Trophy
1967 Lytham Trophy
1968 Lytham Trophy
1969 Brabazon Trophy (tie with Michael Bonallack)
1970 Brabazon Trophy

Team appearances
Walker Cup (representing Great Britain & Ireland): 1965 (tied), 1967, 1969, 1971 (winners), 1973, 1979 (non-playing captain), 1981 (non-playing captain)
Eisenhower Trophy (representing Great Britain & Ireland): 1964 (winners), 1970
St Andrews Trophy (representing Great Britain & Ireland): 1964 (winners), 1966 (winners), 1968 (winners), 1970 (winners)
Commonwealth Tournament (representing Great Britain): 1967 (joint winners), 1971
European Amateur Team Championship (representing England): 1963 (winners), 1965, 1967, 1969 (winners), 1971 (winners), 1973 (winners)

References

English male golfers
Amateur golfers
Sportspeople from Shipley, West Yorkshire
1941 births
Living people